Rohina Malik is a British-born American playwright, actress, speaker, story teller and  educator of South Asian descent. She is also the artistic director for Medina Theater Collective.

Biography
She was born and raised in London, England, where she showed great interest in theatre and drama. Her father is Pakistani while her mother is Indian. She attended Brentford School for Girls in Hounslow, London where her interest in theater was developed. At the age of 15, she migrated to Chicago with her family and attended Niles North High School in Skokie, Illinois, where she wrote and performed in several theatrical plays. 

She went to DePaul University completing a degree in Bachelor of Arts in Comparative Religions and is a certified Montessori teacher.

Her career in playwrighting and performance arts started in 2008 after taking a class on writing a one-person play with Tekki Lominicki in April 2008. During the same class, she started writing her much-acclaimed play Unveiled. She was offered at the end of the class to perform a sample of her play in the Fillet of Solo Festival at Live Bait Theater in July 2008. The next year, Unveiled had its world premiere at the 16th Street Theater, directed by Ann Filmer.  Malik was offered a one-year residency at The Goodman Theater, in the inaugural group of The Goodman's Playwrights Unit.

Since 2010, Malik regularly performs her play Unveiled in universities, churches, synagogues, interfaith and other places of worship to open up discussion about hate crimes, identity, tolerance and discrimination.

She has also participated as a keynote speaker at several conferences throughout North America including at a TedX and CueBall event.

Full productions

Unveiled
 June 2019 - Regional Premiere performed at Watch Tower Theater Addison TX
 February 2018 - "Unveiled" performed at Greater Boston Stage Company
 January 2018 - "Unveiled" Performed at New Repertory Theatre as part of 2017-18 Season 
 June/July 2016 - South Africa Premiere of "Unveiled" ""  at 2016 National Arts Festival, Grahamstone & "" 969 Festival, Johannesburg performed by Gulshan Mia 
 June 2015 - New York Premiere of "Unveiled" at Voyage Theater Company 
 September 2014 - "Unveiled" performed at Edison Theatre as part of the Ovations Series
 April 2013 - "Unveiled" performed at Crossroads Theater Company, NJ
 2012 - Theater Project Baltimore 
 Sept 2011 - Fourth Production of "Unveiled" at Brava Theater, San Francisco, CA 
 2010 - Third Production of "Unveiled" at Next Theater Company in Evanston, IL
 March 2010 - Chicago Premiere of "Unveiled" at Victory Gardens Theater 
 May/June 2009 - "Unveiled" was extended for an additional month at 16th Street Theater in Berwyn, IL 
 April/May 2009 – World Premiere of "Unveiled" at 16th Street Theater in Berwyn, IL

Yasmina's Necklace
 September 2019 - New Jersey Premiere "Yasmina's Necklace" at Premiere Stages at Bauer Boucher Theatre Center 
October 2017 - Chicago Premiere of "Yasmina's Necklace" at Goodman Theater (October/November 2017)
 January 2017 - St. Louis Premiere of "Yasmina's Necklace" at Mustard Seed Theater Jan/Feb 2017
 January 2016 - World Premiere of "Yasmina's Necklace" at 16th Street Theater in Berwyn, IL

The Mecca Tales
 November 2017 - "Mecca Tales" at Crossroads Theater, NJ 
 October 2017 - "Mecca Tales" at Voyage Theater, New York 
 October 2014 - Chicago Dramatists announces the World Premiere of "The Mecca Tales" in March/April 2015
The Hijabis

April 2022 - Hope College

March 2022 - “The Hijabis” at George Fox University, Oregon 

February 2022 - World Premiere of “The Hijabis” at Carroll College, Montana

Nomination and awards
 February 2019 - Unveiled - IRNE Award Nominee - Best Solo Performance
March 2018 - 2018 Theatre Women Awards - Lee Reynolds Award 
 November 2017 - Yasmina's Necklace (Chicago edition) - Jeff Recommended 
 August 2016 - Yasmina's Necklace (World Premiere)  2016 Equity Jeff Award Nominee For New Work
 August 2015 - The Mecca Tales 2015 Equity Jeff Award Nominee For New Work
 October 2013 – 2013 YWomen Leadership Award – Woman of Promise
 August 2011 – Nominated for 3 Arts Artist Award in playwrighting

Career highlights
 July 2019 - Commissioned by Big Bridge Theatre Consortium (BBTC) to be produced in 2021-22
December 2018 - Speaker at a Ted X Chicago event, "Power of the Pen" Chicago USA
 Spring 2018 -  Alice Kaplan Institute for the Humanities Artist in Residence, Northwestern University, USA
 September 2016 - Accepted as an artistic affiliate at American Blues Theater, Chicago IL
 March 2016 - Commissioned by The Hypocrites to develop new play inspired by Syrian musician responses to the refugee crisis.
 September 2011 – 2017 – Accepted as one of the 4 new additions to Chicago Dramatist's resident playwrights
 January 2015 - Accepted as an artistic associate at Voyage Theater Company, New York, NY
 November/December 2011 – Collaborated with Tanya Saracho and Elizabeth Berg in "Our Holiday Stories" which was produced by 16th Street Theater, Berwyn IL
 May 2011 – Playwright Unit Series; "The Mecca Tales", Goodman Theatre commission in Chicago, IL 
 2010/11 – Accepted as one of the four playwrights in the inaugural Playwrights Unit at Goodman Theatre in Chicago, IL
 2010 – Accepted as an artistic associate at 16th Street Theater, Berwyn IL 
 December 2009 – New Stage Series; "Yasmina's Necklace" Goodman Theatre in Chicago, IL
 August 2008 – Workshopped her play "Unveiled" with Rivendale Theatre
 July 2008 – Performed sample of "Unveiled" at the Filet of Solo Festival

Selected works
The Hijabis (2020)
Zujaj (Glass) (2016)
Short Play for After Orlando Project - At the Store with my Daughter  (2016)
The Mecca Tales (2011)
Yasmina's Necklace (2010)
Unveiled – One Woman Play about Muslim Women post 9/11 (2009)

Publications
Yasmina's Necklace - Full-Length Play by Rohina Malik (2018) Published by Dramatic Publishing - 
Unveiled - One Woman Play about Muslim Women (2013)

Other activities
She was requested to provide video based inspirational reflections for 30 Good Minutes (a weekly multifaith program on WTTW (Channel 11)) PBS in Chicago. Her reflections will be shown throughout 2012 as part of the weekly program.

She has performed her play "Unveiled" at various interfaith events, high schools and universities for example Princeton, Yale, University of Chicago, Brigham Young University, University of Oklahoma, Columbia University, Harvard University, University of Illinois, Stanford University.

She gave the keynote address at Dartmouth College for MLK Event in Jan 2016

References

Living people
American stage actresses
Writers from London
DePaul University alumni
British women dramatists and playwrights
British emigrants to the United States
21st-century American actresses
21st-century American dramatists and playwrights
21st-century British women writers
American film actors of Pakistani descent
Year of birth missing (living people)
American people of Indian descent